The 1958 NCAA Men's Ice Hockey Tournament was the culmination of the 1957–58 NCAA men's ice hockey season, the 11th such tournament in NCAA history. It was held between March 13 and 15, 1958, and concluded with Denver defeating North Dakota 6-2. All games were played at the Williams Arena in Minneapolis, Minnesota.

This was the first NCAA tournament to take place outside Colorado Springs, Colorado.

Qualifying teams
Four teams qualified for the tournament, two each from the eastern and western regions. The two best WIHL teams and a Tri-State League representative received bids into the tournament as did one independent school.

Format
The Tri-State League team was seeded as the top eastern team while the WIHL champion with the greater winning percentage was given the top western seed. The second eastern seed was slotted to play the top western seed and vice versa. All games were played at the Williams Arena. All matches were Single-game eliminations with the semifinal winners advancing to the national championship game and the losers playing in a consolation game.

Bracket

Note: * denotes overtime period(s)

Semifinals

Clarkson vs. Denver

North Dakota vs. Harvard

Consolation Game

Clarkson vs. Harvard

National Championship

North Dakota vs. Denver

All-Tournament team

First Team
G: Rodney Schneck (Denver)
D: Bill Steenson (North Dakota)
D: Ed Zemrau (Denver)
F: Murray Massier* (Denver)
F: Bob Van Lammers (Clarkson)
F: Jim Brown (Denver)
* Most Outstanding Player(s)

Second Team
G: Eddie MacDonald (Clarkson)
D: Blair Livingstone (Denver)
D: Ralph Lyndon (North Dakota)
F: Barry Sharp (Denver)
F: Ron King (North Dakota)
F: John MacMillan (Denver)

References

Tournament
NCAA Division I men's ice hockey tournament
NCAA Men's Ice Hockey Tournament
NCAA Men's Ice Hockey Tournament
1950s in Minneapolis
Ice hockey competitions in Minneapolis